The paramotor slalom tournaments at the 2017 World Games in Wrocław was played between 21 and 23 July. 17 Paramotor slalom competitors, from 5 nations, participated in the tournament. The air sports competition took place at Szymanów Airport in Szymanów.

Competition format
Final: The 17 paramotor slalom competitors perform nine rounds; the top three pilots win the gold, silver and bronze medals accordingly.

Schedule 
All times are Central European Summer Time (UTC+2)

Results

Medalists

References
Summary of Tasks

External links
 Result on IWGA website

Paramotor slalom